{{Infobox college softball team
|name = Virginia Tech Hokies
|logo = Virginia Tech Hokies logo.svg
|logo_size = 
|university = Virginia Polytechnic Institute and State University
|conference = Atlantic Coast Conference
|conference_short = ACC
|division =Coastal 
|founded = 1996
|city = Blacksburg
|stateabb = VA
|state = Virginia
|coach =  Pete D'Amour
|tenure = 5th
|stadium = Tech Softball Park
|capacity = 1,100
|nickname = Hokies
|national_champion = 
|wcws = 2008
|super_regional = 2008, 2021, 2022
|ncaa_tourneys = 2005, 2006, 2007, 2008, 2012, 2013, 2014, 2015, 2019, 2021, 2022
|conference_tournament = 2007, 2008
|conference_champion = 2007, 2019, 2022

ACC Coastal2019''
}}

The Virginia Tech Hokies softball team''' is a college softball program that competes in NCAA Division I and the Atlantic Coast Conference. Their home games are played at Tech Softball Park. The team appeared in the NCAA Tournament in four successive seasons (2005–2008), were conference champions in 2007 and 2008, and advanced to the Women's College World Series in 2008. A big part of this success was the pitching of Angela Tincher, who had a historic career at Virginia Tech, becoming only the third person in NCAA Softball to record 2,000 career strikeouts. The Hokies also did what no other college has ever done, beating the U.S. Olympic Softball Team in a victory that ended Team USA's 12-year, 185-game winning streak. The Hokies won this game by a score of 1–0 and Tincher pitched a no hitter, and also allowing no balls to reach the outfield.

Championships

Conference Championships

Conference Tournament Championships

Awards and honors
Sources:

National Awards

USA Softball Collegiate Player of the Year

Angela Tincher, 2008

Conference Awards and Honors

Atlantic 10 Player of the Year
Michelle Meadows, 2000

Atlantic 10 Freshman of the Year
Ali Verbage, 1998
Ashlee Dobbe, 1999

ACC Player of the Year
Angela Tincher, 2006
Keely Rochard, 2022

ACC Pitcher of the Year
Angela Tincher, 2006, 2007, 2008
Carrie Eberle, 2019
Keely Rochard, 2021 
Keely Rochard, 2022

ACC Freshman of the Year
Lauren Duff, 2016
Kelsey Bennett, 2019
Emma Lemley, 2022

Big East All Conference
Amy Voorhees, 2001
Shanel Garafalo, 2001
Catherine Gilliam, 2001
Clarisa Crowell, 2002
Amy Voorhees, 2002
Rachel Pacheco, 2003
Kelly Brown, 2003
Megan Evans, 2004
Sarah Prosise, 2004
Caitlin Murphy, 2004

See also
List of NCAA Division I softball programs

References

External links
 Softball-Hokie Sports

 
Sports clubs established in 1996
1996 establishments in Virginia